SMS V4 was a V1-class torpedo boat of the Imperial German Navy. The ship was built by AG Vulcan, completing in 1912. She served in the First World War and was sunk at the Battle of Jutland on 1 June 1916.

Construction and design
In 1911, the Imperial German Navy placed orders for a flotilla of 12 torpedo boats as part of its shipbuilding programme for that year, with one half flotilla of six ordered from AG Vulcan, and six from Germaniawerft. The 1911 torpedo boats were smaller than those ordered in recent years in order to be more manoeuvrable and so work better with the fleet, which resulted in the numbering series for torpedo boats being restarted. The reduction in size resulted in the ships' seaworthiness being adversely affected.

V4 was launched from Vulcan's Stettin, Prussia (now Szczecin in Poland) shipyard on 23 December 1911 and commissioned on 15 June 1912.

Armament consisted of two  SK L/30 naval guns in single mounts fore and aft, together with four 50 cm (19.7 in) torpedo tubes with one reload torpedo carried. Up to 18 mines could be carried. In 1916 the L/30 guns were replaced by more powerful  SK L/45 guns. The ship had a crew of 74 officers and other ranks.

Service
In May 1914 V4 was part of the 10th Half-Flotilla, 5th Torpedo Boat Flotilla. On 28 August 1914, a British force of destroyers and cruisers supported by battlecruisers made a sortie into the Heligoland Bight in order to ambush German torpedo boats on patrol, which caused the Battle of Heligoland Bight. The 5th Torpedo Boat Flotilla, including V4, were sent out from Heligoland to investigate sightings of British submarines (which were deployed as bait to draw out German ships), and ran into several British destroyers. The Flotilla then turned away to try and escape the trap, but V4s sister ship  could not make full speed and was hit several times by British shells before the arrival of the German cruiser  allowed the 5th Flotilla to escape. In total, however, three German light cruisers (and ) and one torpedo boat of the German outer screen had been sunk. V4 was also present at the Battle of Dogger Bank on 24 January 1915.

At the Battle of Jutland on 31 May–1 June 1916, V4 remained part of the 10th Half-Flotilla, 5th Torpedo Boat Flotilla, operating in support of the main German battle fleet. At about 03:15 hr CET (i.e. 02:15 hr GMT) the 5th Flotilla was accompanying the German Fleet on its journey back to base  when a large underwater explosion, probably due to a floating mine, blew the bows off V4, killing 18 and wounding four. After the survivors were rescued, sister ship  scuttled V4 with shellfire and a torpedo.

See also
German ocean-going torpedo boats of World War I

References

 

Torpedo boats of the Imperial German Navy
Ships built in Stettin
1911 ships
World War I torpedo boats of Germany
Maritime incidents in 1916
Ships sunk at the Battle of Jutland
V1-class destroyers